The 1948 United States presidential election in Indiana took place on November 2, 1948, as part of the 1948 United States presidential election. Indiana voters chose 13 representatives, or electors, to the Electoral College, who voted for president and vice president.

Indiana was won by Governor Thomas Dewey (R–New York), running with Governor Earl Warren, with 49.58% of the popular vote, against incumbent President Harry S. Truman (D–Missouri), running with Senator Alben W. Barkley, with 48.78% of the popular vote. , this is the last time that Johnson County voted for a Democratic presidential candidate. This was also the last time until 2012 that Indiana voted for a different candidate than nearby Virginia.

Results

Results by county

See also
 United States presidential elections in Indiana

References

Indiana
1948
1948 Indiana elections